Valery Kaufman (born 30 May 1994) is a Russian model best known for walking in Victoria's Secret Fashion Show 2015 and Victoria's Secret Fashion Show 2016.

Career 
She was born in 1994 in Moscow. From an early age she was engaged in dancing. Later she toured the world extensively.

In the early 2010s, she sent her photos to several model agencies in New York, and soon received an invitation to a casting call for a fashion show by Tom Ford, which she successfully passed. Her career as a model developed quickly. Following her appearance on the cover of the Russian edition of Vogue in March 2015, she received invitations to fashion shows by Chanel, Dior and Valentino.

At various times she has participated in the shows of Alberta Ferretti, Alexander Wang, Alexandre Vauthier, Balmain, Blumarine, Chanel, Christian Dior, Diane von Furstenberg, Dolce & Gabbana, Elie Saab, Emilio Pucci, Fendi, Giambattista Valli, Giorgio Armani, Givenchy, Gucci, Louis Vuitton, Nina Ricci, Oscar de la Renta, Prada, Tom Ford, Valentino, Versace, Yves Saint Laurent and others.

Valeria is one of French photographer Patrick Demarchelier's favorite models. In 2015 and 2016, she was invited to the Victoria's Secret Fashion Show.

In 2015, she was named one of the "World's Top 50 Models" by Models.com, and was recognized as the best Russian model by Glamour magazine.

Personal life 
From 2015 to 2021, she was in a relationship with American musician and actor Jared Leto.

References

External links 

 

1994 births
Living people
Russian female models
IMG Models models